A Marvelous Order is an opera by Judd Greenstein to a libretto by Tracy K. Smith about New York urban activist Jane Jacobs and urban planner Robert Moses. The work was conceived by three artists—Greenstein, Smith and director Joshua Frankel, who also created animation that is projected throughout the opera. A Marvelous Order was given a work-in-progress "pre-premiere" in March 2016 at the '62 Center for Theater and Dance at Williams College. An excerpt was presented in June 2017 at the Fulton Center in New York City by the River to River Festival. In 2021, excerpts of A Marvelous Order were presented by Brooklyn Public Library in the plaza in front of the Central Library, outdoors, in concert, with animation projected onto the building’s Art Deco facade. The completed opera had its world premiere on October 20, 2022 at the Center for the Performing Arts at Penn State, in the culmination of a multi-year partnership which included three creative development residencies.

References

Further reading

External links 

 

2016 operas
Operas
English-language operas
Operas set in the United States
Operas based on real people